Gibbula albida, common name the whitish gibbula, is a species of small sea snail, a marine gastropod mollusc in the family Trochidae, the top snails.

Description
The size of the shell varies between 10 mm and 24 mm. The solid, umbilicate or imperforate shell has a conical shape. it is whitish, painted with longitudinal stripes of red, brown or purple, the base striped, maculated or mottled. The acute spire contains 7 whorls. These are tumid below the sutures and sometimes obsoletely plicate there and spirally lirate.  The body whorl is tumid at the periphery and convex beneath. The columella is slightly sinuous and prominent in the middle. The white umbilicus is funnel-shaped when open, frequently closed.

Distribution
This species occurs in the Atlantic Ocean, the Mediterranean Sea, the Black Sea and the Sea of Azov

References

 Dillwyn L. W., 1817: A descriptive catalogue of Recent shells, arranged according to the Linnean method; London, Vol. 1: pp. 580 + 5 pl. . Vol. 2: pp. 581–1092 + 29 pl.
 Cantraine F. J., 1835: Diagnoses ou descriptions succinctes de quelques espèces nouvelles de mollusques ; Bulletins de l'Académie Royale des Sciences et Belles-lettres de Bruxelles 2 (11): 380-411
 Deshayes G. P., 1835: Mollusques. pp. 81–203, pl. 18-26, in Bory de Saint-Vincent J.B.G.M. (ed.), Expédition scientifique de Morée. Section des Sciences Physiques. Tome III. 1ere Partie. Zoologie. Première Section. Animaux vertébrés, Mollusques et Polypiers. Levrault, Paris, 81-203 pl. 18-26
 Philippi R. A., 1836: Enumeratio molluscorum Siciliae cum viventium tum in tellure tertiaria fossilium, quae in itinere suo observavit. Vol. 1 ; Schropp, Berlin [Berolini] xiv + 267 p., pl. 1-12
 Forbes E., 1844: Report on the Mollusca and Radiata of the Aegean sea, and on their distribution, considered as bearing on geology; Reports of the British Association for the Advancement of Science (1843): 130-193
 Nardo D., 1847: Sinonimia moderna delle specie registrate nell’opera intitolata: Descrizione de’Crostacei, de’Testacei e de’Pesci che abitano le Lagune e Golfo Veneto, rappresentati in figure, a chiaroscuro ed a colori dall’ Abate Stefano Chiereghini Ven. Clodiense applicata per commissione governativa; Venezia pp. i-xi, 1-127
 Coen G., 1930: Gibbula (Forskaliopsis nov. sect.) Bellinii n. sp. nuovo gasteropodo marino di Capri ; Annuario del Museo Zoologico della Reale Università di Napoli (n. ser.) 6(4): 2
 Gofas, S.; Le Renard, J.; Bouchet, P. (2001). Mollusca, in: Costello, M.J. et al. (Ed.) (2001). European register of marine species: a check-list of the marine species in Europe and a bibliography of guides to their identification. Collection Patrimoines Naturels, 50: pp. 180–213

albida
Gastropods described in 1790
Taxa named by Johann Friedrich Gmelin